Hymenoxys hoopesii (formerly Dugaldia hoopesii) is a species of flowering plant in the daisy family known by the common names owl's claws, orange sneezeweed, and yerba del lobo. It is native to the western United States, where it grows in habitats of moderate elevation, such as mountain meadows in the Rocky Mountains, Sierra Nevada, southern Cascades, and other ranges. It has been found from Arizona, New Mexico, and central California north as far as Montana and Oregon.

Blooming from July to September, the inflorescence bears several flower heads on erect peduncles, each lined with a base of hairy, pointed phyllaries. The fruit is an achene with a pappus of scales.

The species is toxic to livestock, especially sheep. The pollen also causes an allergenic reaction, hence the common name 'sneezeweed'.

The root has been used medicinally to treat rheumatism, upset stomachs, and indigestion in infants.

References

External links
 
Jepson Manual Treatment, University of California
United States Department of Agriculture Plants Profile
Calphotos Photo gallery, University of California

Flora of the Western United States
hoopesii
Plants described in 1864
Flora without expected TNC conservation status